Voznesenovka is a rural locality (a selo) and the administrative center of Voznesenovskoye Rural Settlement, Shebekinsky District, Belgorod Oblast, Russia. The population was 1,466 as of 2010. There are 20 streets.

Geography 
Voznesenovka is located 15 km east of Shebekino (the district's administrative centre) by road. Nezhegol is the nearest rural locality.

References 

Rural localities in Shebekinsky District